The 25th TVyNovelas Awards is an Academy of special awards to the best of soap operas and TV shows. The awards ceremony took place on May 12, 2007 in the Forum Mundo Imperial, Acapulco, Guerrero. The ceremony was televised in the Mexico by Canal de las estrellas.

Lucero hosted the show. La fea más bella won 7 awards including Best Telenovela of the Year, the most for the evening. Other winners La verdad oculta and Mundo de fieras won 3 awards and Código Postal won one award.

Summary of awards and nominations

Winners and nominees

Novelas

Others

Special Awards
Audience's Favorite Program: La fea más bella
Audience's Favorite Star: Edith González for Mundo de fieras
Special Award for Silvia Pinal's Mujer, casos de la vida real
Artistic Career: Veronica Castro
Entertainment Program: Otro Rollo

Missing
People who did not attend ceremony wing and were nominated in the shortlist in each category:
 Ana Layevska
 Emilio Larrosa
 Jacqueline Bracamontes
 Karyme Lozano
 Laura Flores
 María Rubio
 María Sorté
 Rafael Amaya
 René Strickler
 Salvador Mejía
 Sergio Sendel
 Valentino Lanús
 Vanessa Guzmán

References 

TVyNovelas Awards
TVyNovelas Awards
TVyNovelas Awards
TVyNovelas Awards ceremonies